Otoyol 20, O-20, Ankara Çevre yolu, is a motorway in Ankara, Turkey that forms the ring road of the city.

The beltway is a four lane motorway in both directions on its length. 

The beltway is the only ring motorway in Turkey to form a complete ring.

See also
 List of highways in Turkey

References

Turkey road map

Transport in Ankara Province
20